Saint Albert of Chiatina (1135–1202) is venerated as a saint by the Catholic Church.  He was archpriest of Colle di Val d'Elsa, and Colle di Val d'Elsa Cathedral is dedicated to him.

References

Sources
Anna Benvenuti (a cura di), "Sant'Alberto di Colle. Studi e documenti"; Ed. Mandragora, Firenze 2005.

External links
 Alberto da Chiatina
 Santi Toscani

13th-century Christian saints
1135 births
1202 deaths
Medieval Italian saints